Daniel Nieto is a Chilean electronic music producer, engineer, and visual artist born in Santiago, Chile.  He is known for his solo work under the name "Danieto" as well as for his role as a member of the group Skipsapiens, along with Pier Bucci.
Daniel Nieto began his career in the late 1990s, influenced by the intelligent dance music movement in the UK. Daniel is also one of the founders of the netlabel Impar.

Career

Under the name "ADN" (Spanish for DNA), Daniel released his first album "Granel" in 2000, as well as the EP "Hormiga", produced by the Chilean label Ojo de Apollo. That same year some of his tracks appeared on the compilation "CODA.05", and later, in 2002, he contributed two tracks to the Ojo de Apollo compilation "CODA.09".

In 2001 Skipsapiens released the eponymous album "Skipsapiens" under the Belgian label "U-Cover". More recently, the same label released the CD "Evolución al Origen" on a limited release of only 95 copies, comprising seven of Daniel's best tracks recorded between 1999 and 2003.

Daniel also took part in two re-mixed albums: “Re'Processed – Interkontinentale Remixe” by “Process” (Steve Gary Barnes), a 2002 12” vinyl for the German label “Traum”; and "Re-mixed, Re-worked, Re-constructed and Re-invented Part One" for the Belgian label U-Cover, also in 2002.

In 2004, Daniel and his business partner Claudio Cisterna won funding from the Chilean governmental program (Fondart) to finance his project for a netlabel. With this funding they created "Impar", a netlabel that promotes experimental electronic music and new artists, offers free downloads, and hosts many of Danieto's tracks in the Impar music library available to download free.

In 2005, Daniel released his first LP, "Cirugía Casual", under the label U-Cover, and, with Pier Bucci as Skipsapiens, released "Skipsapiens-eco" under the label Mutek. He also remixed Hans Carstens' track "Compacto (pn003)" for the label Pueblo Nuevo and that same year performed in Mexico City, Montreal, and Valparaíso, Chile

In 2006, he released two new albums for U-Cover, one called "Contemplación de la Vida Inerte" (English: Contemplation of the Inert Life), with Claudio Cisterna as “Danieto + Flipper”, and one called “Multitono”. He also released the album “Agranelado” for the label Pueblo Nuevo.

Since then, most of his albums have been released under Impar, his own label.

Discography

Albums

 Evolución Al Origen (CDr, Album, Ltd) U-Cover CDr Limited – 2004                      	
 Cirugía Casual (CD, Album) U-Cover – 2005                    	
 Prebuffer – Abducibot (CD, Album, RE, Ltd) U-Cover Transparente – 2006                       	
 Danieto + Flipper (4) – Multitono (CD, Album, Ltd) U-Cover Transparente – 2006                         	
Contemplación De La Vida Inerte (CDr, Album, Ltd) CDr Limited – 2006              	

Singles & EPs
            	
 Agranelado EP (4xFile, MP3, EP, 192) Pueblo Nuevo – 2006                    	
 Ciencias Incultas E.P. (5xFile, MP3, EP, 320) Miga – 2008                          	
 Nueva Estación EP (12", EP) Level Records – 2010
                            	

Miscellaneous
            	
 Danieto + Flipper (4) – PanCromatico (7xFile, MP3) Impar – 2004                         	
 Pre Buffer (6xFile, MP3) Impar −2004                	
 Abducibot (7xFile, MP3) Impar −2005
 Ruta 5: Austral (2000 – Edición extranjera)
 Mutek 05 (2005 – Edición extranjera)
 Memorias de un calabozo (2006 – Pueblo Nuevo)
 Multitono (2006 – Edición extranjera)
 Música chilena de raíz electrónica (2007 – Pueblo Nuevo)
 Epa Toasted (2008 – Epa Sonidos)
 Impar 10 (2009 – Impar)
 Fluorescence (2012 – Epa Sonidos)

References

External links
  Official Website
 Impar official website

Living people
Chilean musicians
People from Santiago
Year of birth missing (living people)